Samuel Slade (born 28 August 1997 in New Zealand) is a rugby union player who plays for Samoa in International. His playing position is flanker. He is also a member of the  2020 Mitre 10 Cup squad, having played for the side since 2019. He has signed with Moana Pasifika for the 2022 Super Rugby Pacific season.

Provincial Rugby
Slade made his provincial debut for Auckland in 2017 and played 6 games and made the New Zealand Under 20's from that. In 2018 Samuel went on loan to Manawatu and played 8 times for the Province before going back up north in 2019 to Counties Manukau and since then has made 16 appearances for the union.

In 2019 he was recruited to the Colorado Raptors for the 2020 season.

Samoa
In 2021 Slade was selected for the Samoan national team to play 2 tests against the Maori All Black's and 2 against Tonga to qualify for the 2023 Rugby World Cup.

References

External links
Steelers profile
Ultimate Rugby profile

1997 births
Samoan rugby union players
Samoa international rugby union players
Living people
Rugby union flankers
Auckland rugby union players
Manawatu rugby union players
Counties Manukau rugby union players
Moana Pasifika players
American Raptors players